Odontodactylus is a genus of mantis shrimp, the only genus in the family Odontodactylidae. Mantis shrimp of the genus Odontodactylus can not only detect circular polarisation of light, but can also detect polarised light reflecting off their telson and uropods.

The genus Odontodactylus contains the following species:
Odontodactylus brevirostris (Miers, 1884)
Odontodactylus cultrifer (White, 1850)
Odontodactylus hansenii (Pocock, 1893)
Odontodactylus havanensis (Bigelow, 1893)
Odontodactylus hawaiiensis Manning, 1967
Odontodactylus japonicus (de Haan, 1844)
Odontodactylus latirostris Borradaile, 1907
Odontodactylus scyllarus (Linnaeus, 1758)

References

Stomatopoda